Berkutovo (Börköt) is a rural locality (a village) in Maxyutovsky Selsoviet, Kugarchinsky District, Bashkortostan, Russia. The population was 11 as of 2010. There is 1 street.

Geography 
Berkutovo is located 53 km south of Mrakovo (the district's administrative centre) by road. Bash-Berkutovo is the nearest rural locality.

References 

Rural localities in Kugarchinsky District